In enzymology, a vanillyl-alcohol oxidase is an enzyme that catalyzes the chemical reaction

 + O2   + H2O2

Thus, the two substrates of this enzyme are vanillyl alcohol and O2, whereas its two products are vanillin and H2O2.

This enzyme belongs to the family of oxidoreductases, specifically those acting on the CH-OH group of donor with oxygen as acceptor.  The systematic name of this enzyme class is vanillyl alcohol:oxygen oxidoreductase. This enzyme is also called 4-hydroxy-2-methoxybenzyl alcohol oxidase.  This enzyme participates in 2,4-dichlorobenzoate degradation.  It employs one cofactor, FAD.

Structural studies 

References 

 
 

EC 1.1.3
Flavoproteins
Enzymes of known structure